Thomas Hesilrige may refer to

Sir Thomas Hesilrige, 1st Baronet (1564 - 1629), MP
Sir Thomas Hesilrige, 4th Baronet (1664 - 1700), MP